Phiala ueleae is a moth in the family Eupterotidae. It was described by Lars Kühne in 2007. It is found in the former Orientale Province of the Democratic Republic of the Congo.

References

Moths described in 2007
Eupterotinae
Endemic fauna of the Democratic Republic of the Congo